Victor Gonța (born 21 September 1988) is a Moldovan football player who currently is playing for Malkiya Club in Bahraini Premier League.

References

External links
 
 
 
 moldova.sports.md
 divizia-a.md

Moldovan footballers
Association football forwards
1988 births
Living people
Malkiya Club players